The Third Palaszczuk Ministry is a ministry of the Government of Queensland led by Annastacia Palaszczuk. Palaszczuk led the Labor Party to a majority victory in the 2020 state election and a third term in government since 2015.

Initial ministry 
On 12 November 2020, Premier Palaszczuk announced a new line up for the ministry.

References 

Queensland ministries
Australian Labor Party ministries in Queensland
Lists of current office-holders in Australia